The Vanderbilt Divinity School and Graduate Department of Religion (usually Vanderbilt Divinity School) is an interdenominational divinity school at Vanderbilt University, a major research university located in Nashville, Tennessee. It is one of only six university-based schools of religion in the United States without a denominational affiliation that service primarily mainline Protestantism (University of Chicago Divinity School, Harvard Divinity School, Wake Forest University School of Divinity, Yale Divinity School, and Howard University School of Divinity are the others).

Early history

Vanderbilt Divinity School was founded in 1875 as the Biblical Department and was under the auspices of the Methodist Episcopal Church, South, one predecessor of the present-day United Methodist Church. In 1914, in concert with the University's severance of its ties with the MECS, the school became interdenominational and ecumenical, and in 1915, the school's name was changed from the Biblical Department of Vanderbilt University to the Vanderbilt School of Religion; it adopted its present name in 1956.  The present physical plant of the school, known colloquially as the "quadrangle" or "quad," was completed in 1960; the Benton Chapel that abuts the quad is named for a mid-20th-century dean, John Keith Benton. In 1966 the Graduate School of Theology of Oberlin College in Ohio merged with that of Vanderbilt, increasing the faculty resources of both the Divinity School and the Graduate Department of Religion, as well as the holdings of the school's portion of the University Library.

Civil Rights era
In 1960, African-American Divinity student James Lawson was expelled from the university for his Civil Rights activism by Chancellor Harvie Branscomb. One of Vanderbilt's trustees, James Geddes Stahlman, published misleading stories in a newspaper he owned, The Nashville Banner, which suggested Lawson had incited others to "violate the law" and led to his expulsion. The Divinity School dean, J. Robert Nelson, who initially believed the stories, eventually resigned in protest. Moreover, with three of his colleagues, Nelson "paid Lawson's $500 bail when he was arrested on charges of conspiracy to violate state laws the day after his expulsion." The school was placed on probation for a year by the American Association of Theological Schools, and the power of trustees was curtailed.

Denominations served

Despite having ended formal association with Methodism nearly a century ago, the United Methodist Church is the largest beneficiary of graduates from the Divinity School, with sizable numbers ordained in denominations such as the Christian Church (Disciples of Christ) (which operates a seminarian apartment nearby the campus), the Presbyterian Church (USA), and African-American Baptist, Methodist, and Pentecostal groups. VDS, through the merger with Oberlin and an earlier absorption of Atlanta Theological Seminary, a Congregationalist seminary in Atlanta, Georgia, in 1929, maintains a historical relationship (although no legal ties) with the United Church of Christ as well.

Students come from throughout the United States, representing numerous denominations and traditions.

Leadership
The dean of the Vanderbilt Divinity School is Emilie M. Townes, formerly on the faculty of Yale Divinity School in Connecticut. Notable recent deans of the Divinity School include Joseph C. Hough, Jr., Sallie McFague, Walter Harrelson, and H. Jackson Forstman.

Vanderbilt Divinity School is a member of the Association of Theological Schools in the United States and Canada.

Notable faculty
 George Arthur Buttrick – English preacher, Minister of the Madison Avenue Presbyterian Church
 David G. Buttrick – Drucilla Moore Buffington Professor of Homiletics and Liturgies 
 Collins Denny – Professor of Mental and Moral Philosophy, Bishop of the Methodist Episcopal Church, South
 Jean Bethke Elshtain – Centennial Professor, ethicist, political philosopher, public intellectual
 Nels F. S. Ferré – Swedish-born theologian, Professor of Philosophical & Systematic Theology
 Stacey M. Floyd-Thomas – Associate Professor of Ethics and Society, Executive Director of the Society of Christian Ethics
 Langdon Brown Gilkey – Professor, Protestant ecumenical theologian, Guggenheim Fellow
 Elijah Embree Hoss – Chair of Ecclesiastical History, Church Polity and Pastoral Theology
 Gordon D. Kaufman – Associate Professor of Theology, President of the American Academy of Religion and American Theological Society
 Amy-Jill Levine – E. Rhodes and Leona B. Carpenter Professor of New Testament Studies
 Paul C.H. Lim – Associate Professor of the History of Christianity
 Sallie McFague – Carpenter Professor of Theology
 Wilhelm Pauck – Distinguished Professor of Church History
 Joerg Rieger – German liberation theologian, Distinguished Professor of Theology
 Jack M. Sasson – Mary Jane Werthan Professor of Jewish Studies and Hebrew Bible
 Choon-Leong Seow – Vanderbilt, Buffington, Cupples Chair in Divinity, Distinguished Professor of Hebrew Bible
 Kelly Miller Smith – former Assistant Dean, civil rights movement activist
 The Rt. Rev. Eugene Sutton – 14th Episcopal Bishop of Maryland
 Fernando Segovia – Oberlin Graduate Professor of New Testament and Early Christianity, Society of Biblical Literature President
 Thomas Osmond Summers – Methodist theologian, Professor of Systematic Theology, former Dean
 Emilie Townes – Dean and E. Rhodes and Leona B. Carpenter Professor of Womanist Ethics and Society
 Willard Uphaus – theologian and pacifist, Director of the World Fellowship Center
 Renita J. Weems – Professor of the Hebrew Bible, writer on religion and race at The Huffington Post

Notable alumni

 Arto Antturi – Finnish Lutheran priest, vicar for the parish of Pitäjänmäki
 Will W. Alexander (B.Th 1912) – Methodist pastor and founder of the Commission on Interracial Cooperation
 Kenneth Lee Carder (D.M. 1980) – United Methodist bishop
 T. C. Chao (M.A., B.D.) – one of the leading Christian theological thinkers in China in the early twentieth century
 Yun Chi-ho (1888-1891) – political activist and thinker during the late 1800s and early 1900s in Joseon Korea
 James L. Crenshaw (Ph.D 1964) – Robert L. Flowers Professor of the Old Testament at Duke University, leading scholar in Old Testament Wisdom literature, Guggenheim Fellow
 Musa Dube (Ph.D 1997) – Botswana feminist theologian, 2011 Humboldt Prize winner
 The Rt. Rev. Robert W. Estill (D.Min 1980) – 9th Bishop of the Episcopal Diocese of North Carolina
 Robert W. Funk (Ph.D 1953) – American biblical scholar, founder of the Jesus Seminar and the nonprofit Westar Institute, Guggenheim Fellow, Fulbright Scholar
 Al Gore (1971–72) – yearlong Rockefeller Foundation scholarship for people planning secular careers
 William M. Greathouse – minister and emeritus general superintendent in the Church of the Nazarene
 William J. Hadden (M.Div 1946) – Episcopal university chaplain, U.S. Army chaplain, U.S. Navy chaplain; desegregationist, World War II's V-12 Navy College Training Program at Vanderbilt
 John Wesley Hardt – Bishop of the United Methodist Church, author, and biographer
 The Rt. Rev. Susan Bunton Haynes (M.Div 1993) – 11th Bishop of the Episcopal Diocese of Southern Virginia
 Roy Herron (M.Div 1980) – former Chairman of the Tennessee Democratic Party
 William G. Johnsson (Ph.D) – Seventh-day Adventist author, former editor of the Adventist Review
 Howard Kester (B.D. 1931) – clergyman and social reformer, organized the Southern Tenant Farmers Union designed by President Franklin D. Roosevelt
 Yung Suk Kim (Ph.D 2006) – Korean-American biblical scholar and author, editor of peer-reviewed journal, Journal of Bible and Human Transformation and the Journal of Race, Ethnicity, and Religion
 James Lawson (M.Div 1960) – civil rights pioneer
 Mark Noll (Ph.D 1975) – historian, Research Professor of History at Regent College, previously Francis A. McAnaney Professor of History at the University of Notre Dame
 Tat-Siong Benny Liew (Ph.D 1997) – 1956 Chair of New Testament Studies at the College of the Holy Cross
 Carroll D. Osburn (D.Div 1970) – American scholar recognized as one of North America’s leading New Testament textual critics and a prominent Christian egalitarian
 Mitch Pacwa  (Ph.D) – bi-ritual American Jesuit priest celebrating liturgy in both the Roman and Maronite rites, president and founder of Ignatius Productions, accomplished linguist
 William Powlas Peery (M.A. 1959) – Pastor of the Andhra Evangelical Lutheran Church in Andhra Pradesh, India, significant figure in South Indian Christianity in the 20th century
 David Penchansky (Ph.D 1988) – scholar of the Hebrew Bible, literary critic to the Old Testament, particularly its Wisdom Literature
 Clare Purcell (B.D. 1916) – Methodist bishop
 Laurel C. Schneider (Ph.D 1997) – Professor of Religious Studies, Religion and Culture at the Vanderbilt Divinity School
 Timothy F. Sedgwick (M.A., Ph.D) – American Episcopal ethicist
 Robert Hitchcock Spain (M.Div.) – United Methodist bishop
 Brock Speer (M.Div) – bass singer for the Speer Family Southern Gospel group
 Ken Stone (M.A. 1992, Ph.D 1995) – author, Chairman of the Reading, Theory and the Bible Section of the Society of Biblical Literature, Lambda Literary Award winner
 Amy Welborn (M.A. in Church History) – Roman Catholic author, columnist, activist, academic and public speaker
 B. Michael Watson (D.M) – bishop of The United Methodist Church
 Sharon D. Welch (Ph.D 1982) – social ethicist and author; Affiliate Faculty, Meadville Lombard Theological School; former Associate Professor, Harvard Divinity School
 Don West (D.Div 1932) – civil rights activist, labor organizer, poet, educator
 Shelli Yoder (M.Div.) – Miss Indiana 1992, former Democratic Party nominee for U.S. Congress (IN-9)

Student awards and prizes 
Vanderbilt Divinity School presents annual awards in recognition of the outstanding achievements of its students. These include the Founder’s Medal, awarded to the top-graduating student from each undergraduate and professional school, the Academic Achievement Award, conferred upon a student that has achieved excellence in the pursuit of a master of divinity degree, and the Umphrey Lee Dean’s Award, presented to a student that represents the vision and mission of the school. Also presented are the Florence Conwell Prize, awarded to a degree candidate who has distinguished themselves by outstanding work in the discipline of preaching, the St. James Academy Award who has composed the most outstanding sermon, the W. Kendrick Grobel Award for outstanding achievement in Biblical studies, and the J.D. Owen Prize, awarded for outstanding course work in a Biblical field.

Additionally, the School recognizes students who have upheld its values and commitments to the Wesleyan ideals of servant leadership, student service, and services to the Divinity School community, with the conferral of the McTyeire, Bettye R. Ford Graduate Student Service, and Divinity Student Government Association Service awards, respectively. The School also confers two annual awards in honor of American theologian and writer, Frederick Buechner: one for Excellence in Writing and one for the best master’s thesis in Theological Studies.

Furthermore, the school awards the Robert Lewis Butler Award for service and ministry in the African-American Church, the Disciples Divinity House Scholar award for academic distinction, the Liston O. Mills award for a student who has achieved distinction in the study of pastoral theology, religion, psychology, and culture. Additional awards include the William A. Newcomb Prize, the Nella May Overby Memorial Prize, the Wilbur F. Tillett Prize, the Elliott F. Shepard Prize, and the John Olin Knott Award.

See also
Wilbur Fisk Tillett (1854-1936), early Dean

References

External links
 Divinity School homepage

Vanderbilt University
Seminaries and theological colleges in Tennessee
Educational institutions established in 1875
Protestant seminaries and theological colleges
1875 establishments in Tennessee